David Minasian is an American film producer, screenwriter, director, and a musician, singer and songwriter. Since the 1980s, he has worked for various motion picture production companies in the Los Angeles area as a freelance producer/director. In addition to his work on music videos and concert films for artists such as Three Dog Night, English progressive rock band Camel, Moody Blues frontman Justin Hayward and The Alan Parsons Project co-founder Alan Parsons, Minasian has produced and directed over 60 documentary films including The Passion Behind the Passion, a behind-the-scenes documentary filmed on location in Rome chronicling the making of Mel Gibson's controversial film The Passion of the Christ. Minasian is also a classically trained pianist. His symphonic rock album Random Acts of Beauty was released in 2010 to critical and public acclaim and features a rare guest appearance on the album's 12 minute opening track "Masquerade" by Camel guitarist Andrew Latimer.

History
Minasian began classical piano training at the age of five and by the age of fifteen was asked to turn professional. However, he chose instead to pursue a career in film production. After graduating with honors with a degree in film and television from California State University, Northridge, Minasian began working freelance for various production companies in the Los Angeles area as a producer, director, writer, editor, cinematographer and composer. In between his work on various documentaries, Minasian recorded his own symphonic rock album titled Tales of Heroes and Lovers which was released independently in 1984. The album featured Minasian on piano, keyboards, and lead vocals along with a group of backing musicians. Six of the album's nine tracks were written or co-written by Minasian. To promote the album, Minasian directed himself in a comedic music video for the album's intended single "It's Driving Me Crazy". The video received airplay on MTV which led to him being asked by Three Dog Night to write and direct a video for their song "A Shot in the Dark".

In 1996, Minasian recorded a second symphonic rock album titled It's Not Too Late with singer William Drews. And in 1997, Minasian began an association with Camel Productions, the production company owned by English progressive rock band Camel. Over the next few years, Minasian would produce and direct a total of nine concert and documentary DVDs for the band's company including Coming of Age, Curriculum Vitae, the Opening Farewell and In from the Cold. In 1998, while working as a second unit director on the motion picture The Joyriders (1999) starring Academy Award© winner Martin Landau and Kris Kristofferson, Minasian composed the film's main theme titled "So Far from Home". The song was released as the single from the soundtrack album by EMI the following year.

In 2009, Minasian began recording a new symphonic rock album with the encouragement and participation of Camel's Andrew Latimer. Random Acts of Beauty was released on October 5, 2010 by ProgRock Records and features David on piano, keyboards, bass and lead vocals together with his son Justin Minasian on guitars. Six of the album's seven tracks are composed solely by David while the seventh, a 14 minute instrumental titled "Frozen in Time", is a joint composition between David and Justin. Appearing on the track "Masquerade" is guest Andrew Latimer on guitar and vocals. This would mark the first studio recording in eight years by Latimer following his recovery from a bone-marrow transplant.

In 2013, Minasian began recording the follow-up to Random Acts of Beauty. The recording process however was interrupted when he was contracted to produce and direct a solo concert DVD for Moody Blues vocalist/guitarist/composer Justin Hayward. Recorded at Atlanta's Buckhead Theatre on August 17, the resulting DVD, Spirits… Live (2014), features the full concert along with a one-hour behind-the-scenes documentary of Hayward's 2013 American tour, also directed by Minasian. Following its release by Eagle Rock/Universal in the Fall of 2014, the DVD immediately rose to the #2 position on the Billboard Music Video charts and would soon be broadcast by the PBS network. Two additional Hayward/Minasian collaborations quickly followed: A concert DVD filmed in Clearwater, Florida titled Watching and Waiting, and The Story Behind Nights in White Satin, an award winning documentary which chronicled the origins of Hayward's classic 1967 composition.

The Spring of 2016 saw another Hayward release from producer/director David Minasian. Titled Live in Concert at The Capitol Theatre, the DVD contained a few surprises including the first live performance of "You Can Never Go Home" from the 1971 Every Good Boy Deserves Favour LP. Also featured was a bonus studio recording of a new song titled "The Wind of Heaven", a joint composition between Minasian and Hayward. Intended as the main theme for a forthcoming motion picture, the song, with an elaborate music video directed by Minasian, was released ahead of schedule on the DVD to coincide with Hayward's 2016 US solo tour.

2019 saw Minasian complete his followup album to Random Acts of Beauty called The Sound of Dreams which contained composition and performance contributions from a host of progressive rock icons including Justin Hayward (The Moody Blues), Steve Hackett (Genesis), Annie Haslam (Renaissance), Billy Sherwood (Yes) and PJ Olsson (The Alan Parsons Live Project). That same year he signed to Golden Robot Records (headed up by Mark Alexander-Erber and Derek Shulman, former lead singer with Gentle Giant and Polygram Records executive) which released the album along with a remastered version of Random Acts of Beauty. A remake of "So Far From Home" featuring PJ Olsson as guest vocalist was released as a single along with a compelling music video. Another track from the album titled "The Sound of Dreams (Third Movement)" featuring guitarist Steve Hackett was released as a follow up single and received nearly 250,000 hits on Spotify almost overnight.

Also that same year, Minasian travelled to Europe and the Middle East to capture The Alan Parsons Live Project in concert. More than twenty cameras were used at each of the venues and two shows were released the following year on Blu-Ray and DVD titled The NeverEnding Show: Live In The Netherlands and One Note Symphony: Live In Tel Aviv. A music video for a new studio recording, also titled The NeverEnding Show was produced by Minasian together with Trinity Houston for IM3 Global Entertainment and Frontiers Records. 

In 2021, a ‘greatest hits’ album titled Random Dreams: The Very Best of David Minasian was released on vinyl. And in the summer of 2022, a song titled "I Won’t Be Led Astray," written by Minasian together with Alan Parsons and Kim Bullard of the Elton John Band and featuring David Pack and Joe Bonamassa, was released as a single off Parsons’ latest album From The New World along with a music video produced and directed by Minasian and Houston.

Discography

Singles
It's Driving Me Crazy by Chris Lloyds (1992) Mega
So Far From Home by Tracy Miller (2000) GoTee/EMI
So Far From Home by David Minasian featuring PJ Olsson (2020) Golden Robot
The Sound of Dreams (Third Movement) by David Minasian featuring Steve Hackett (2020) Golden Robot
The Sound of Dreams (First Movement) by David Minasian featuring Annie Haslam, Steve Hackett, Billy Sherwood (2021) Golden Robot
Masquerade by David Minasian featuring Andrew Latimer (2021) Golden Robot
Room With Dark Corners by David Minasian featuring Julie Ragins, Geof O'Keefe (2021) Golden Robot
Summer's End by David Minasian featuring Justin Minasian (2021) Golden Robot
I Won't Be Led Astray by Alan Parsons featuring David Pack, Joe Bonamassa (2022) Frontiers

Albums
Tales of Heroes and Lovers by David Minasian (1984) New Palace/LBL
It's Not Too Late by David Minasian & William Drews (1996) Jeremiah
The Joyriders (Original Motion Picture Soundtrack) by Various Artists (2000) GoTee/EMI
Random Acts of Beauty by David Minasian (2010) ProgRock
All The Way by Justin Hayward (2016) Eagle Rock/Universal
The Sound of Dreams by David Minasian (2020) Golden Robot
Random Acts of Beauty (Remaster) by David Minasian (2020) Golden Robot
Random Dreams: The Very Best of David Minasian by David Minasian (2021) Golden Robot
From The New World by Alan Parsons (2022) Frontiers

References

External links
 David Minasian official website

Living people
Film producers from California
American film directors
American keyboardists
American male songwriters
American people of Armenian descent
Progressive rock musicians
Progressive rock pianists
People from Greater Los Angeles
California State University, Northridge alumni
Male pianists
21st-century pianists
21st-century American male musicians
Year of birth missing (living people)